The 1893 All-Ireland Senior Hurling Championship Final was the 6th All-Ireland Final and the culmination of the 1893 All-Ireland Senior Hurling Championship, an inter-county hurling tournament for the top teams in Ireland. The match was held at the Phoenix Park, Dublin, on 24 June 1894 between Cork, represented by club side Blackrock, and Kilkenny, represented by club side Confederation. The Leinster champions lost to their Munster opponents on a score line of 6-8 to 0-2.

Match details

1
All-Ireland Senior Hurling Championship Finals
Cork county hurling team matches
Kilkenny county hurling team matches
June 1894 sports events